James J. Dwyer is an American politician who represents the 30th Middlesex District in the Massachusetts House of Representatives. He was a member of the Woburn Housing Authority from 2000 to 2004 and the Woburn City Council from 2006 to 2009.

From 1975 to 2007, Dwyer worked for the Massachusetts Probation Department as a juvenile probation officer in the Middlesex Juvenile Court.

References

Democratic Party members of the Massachusetts House of Representatives
People from Woburn, Massachusetts
Probation and parole officers
Norwich University alumni
Anna Maria College alumni
Living people
21st-century American politicians
Year of birth missing (living people)